Cauchas rufifrontella is a moth of the Adelidae family. It is found in most of Europe, except Ireland, Great Britain, the Benelux, the Iberian Peninsula, Switzerland, Fennoscandia, the Baltic region, Bulgaria and Ukraine.

The wingspan is 9–12 mm.

The larvae feed on Valeriana officinalis.

References

Moths described in 1833
Adelidae
Moths of Europe
Moths of Asia